The 1969 Valley State Matadors football team represented San Fernando Valley State College—now known as California State University, Northridge—as a member of the California Collegiate Athletic Association (CCAA) during the 1969 NCAA College Division football season. Led by first-year head coach Leon McLaughlin, Valley State compiled an overall record of 4–5 with a mark of 1–1 in conference play, placing second in the CCAA. The Matadors played home games at Birmingham High School in Van Nuys, California.

CCAA football changed significantly in 1969. Three teams—Fresno State, Long Beach State, and Cal State Los Angeles—left the conference and moved up to NCAA University Division competition, joining in the newly-formed Pacific Coast Athletic Association. They were replaced by Cal Poly Pomona and UC Riverside.

Schedule

Team players in the NFL
No Valley State players were selected in the 1970 NFL Draft.

The following finished their college career in 1969, were not drafted, but played in the NFL.

References

Valley State
Cal State Northridge Matadors football seasons
Valley State Matadors football